Guynemer may refer to:

 Georges Guynemer (1894–1917) French WWI flying ace
 Guynemer of Boulogne, Boulognese pirate and Crusader of the First Crusade
 Monument Guynemer, Guynemer Square, Poelkapelle, Flanders, Belgium; see List of World War I memorials and cemeteries in Flanders
 Guynemer, Saint-Denis, Ile-de-France, France; a tram stop; see List of tram stops in Île-de-France
 Mikumo Guynemer, a fictional character from Macross Delta; see List of Macross Delta characters

See also

 Célestin Guynemer de la Hailandière (1798–1882) Bishop of Vincennes